Kelly Van den Steen (born 1 September 1995) is a Belgian racing cyclist, who currently rides for UCI Women's Continental Team . She rode at the 2014 UCI Road World Championships. In August 2021 she married Michael Vanthourenhout.

References

External links
 

1995 births
Living people
Belgian female cyclists
Place of birth missing (living people)
People from Wetteren
Cyclists from East Flanders
21st-century Belgian women